Joana Cotar (born 6 April 1973) is a German politician and since 2017 member of the Bundestag, the federal legislative body. Until November 2022, she was a member for the Alternative for Germany (AfD).

Life and politics

Cotar was born 1973 in Pitești, Romania and studied German studies and political science at University of Mannheim.

Cotar entered the newly founded AfD in 2013 and became a member of the Bundestag after the 2017 German federal election.

Cotar is a member of the federal executive board of the AfD. She was part of the intra-party power struggle between the right-wing AfD-chairmen Jörg Meuthen and the right-wing extremist members of the board. Cotar belongs to the Meuthen-fraction and is publicly criticizing chairmen Tino Chrupalla.

According to her account, she left the AfD on 21 November 2022. Cotar cites "the close proximity of leading AfD officials to the President of the Russian Federation" as reason for her resignation.

References

Living people
1973 births
People from Pitești
Members of the Bundestag 2021–2025
Members of the Bundestag 2017–2021
Members of the Bundestag for the Alternative for Germany
Romanian emigrants to Germany
21st-century German women politicians
Female members of the Bundestag